The Historic Beth Joseph Tupper Lake Synagogue and Gallery is a historic synagogue located in Tupper Lake, Franklin County, New York.  It was built in 1906, and is a -story, three-bay by five-bay, vernacular Italianate style frame building.  It is sheathed in clapboard and has a false front that hides a steep gable roof. The front facade features a "sun dial" arch and rose window, round arched windows, and square corner towers.  Also on the property is a contributing -story, hip-roofed frame dwelling built between 1906 and 1910. The synagogue was closed for over three decades.  Today, it is the oldest synagogue in the Adirondack Mountains, but it is only open in the summer.  It houses a small museum.

It was added to the National Register of Historic Places in 1988.

References

External links
Synagogue website

Synagogues in Upstate New York
Synagogues on the National Register of Historic Places in New York (state)
Italianate architecture in New York (state)
Italianate synagogues
Synagogues completed in 1906
Museums in Franklin County, New York
Jewish museums in New York (state)
Synagogues preserved as museums
National Register of Historic Places in Franklin County, New York
1906 establishments in New York (state)